Wayne Yokoyama is an American biologist, currently the Sam J. Levin and Audrey Loew Levin Professor at Washington University in St. Louis and an Elected Fellow of the American Association for the Advancement of Science. He became a co-editor of the Annual Review of Immunology in 2013.

References

Year of birth missing (living people)
Living people
Fellows of the American Association for the Advancement of Science
Washington University in St. Louis faculty
21st-century American biologists
Annual Reviews (publisher) editors
Members of the National Academy of Medicine